The Tour Guide of Lisbon is a 1956 West German musical comedy film directed by Hans Deppe and starring Vico Torriani, Inge Egger, and Gunnar Möller.

The film's sets were designed by the art directors Willi Herrmann and Heinrich Weidemann. It was shot at the Spandau Studios in Berlin and on location in Lisbon.

Cast

References

Bibliography

External links 
 

1956 films
West German films
German musical comedy films
1956 musical comedy films
1950s German-language films
Films directed by Hans Deppe
Films shot in Lisbon
Films set in Lisbon
Films shot at Spandau Studios
1950s German films
German black-and-white films